The 2020–21 Copa de la Reina de Fútbol was the 39th edition of the Spanish women's association football national cup, and was played between 21 April and 30 May 2021.

Format changes
Since the 2018–19 edition of the tournament, all 16 teams in the Primera División partook in the competition, with all rounds being played in a single match. This season, however, due to the COVID-19 pandemic, the competition returned to an 8-team tournament without a Round of 16, which was the structure prior to the 2018-19 season.

Schedule and format
All ties are played in a one match decider at a home ground. The first draw for the tournament took place on 5 April 2021.

 In the first stage, teams that play in the UEFA Women's Champions League cannot play each other.
 Each quarterfinal and semifinal matchup are determined by draw.

The Royal Spanish Football Federation (RFEF) announced that both the semifinals and the final would be played in the Estadio Municipal de Butarque, in Leganés, Spain.

Notes
Single-match rounds ending in a tie will be decided in extra time; and if it persists, by a penalty shootout.

Matches

Bracket

Quarterfinals

Semifinals

Final

Top goalscorers

References

External links
Royal Spanish Football Federation
Copa de la Reina at La Liga website

Women
Copa de la Reina
Copa de la Reina de Fútbol seasons